Student life may refer to:
 The everyday life of a student
 Student Life Organization, a student-led society used in SABIS schools
 Student affairs, a department or division of services and support for students at institutions of higher education
 Student Life (newspaper), student newspaper of Washington University in St. Louis
 Student Life (university ministry), university ministry in Australia and New Zealand
 The Student Life, student newspaper of the Claremont Colleges in Claremont, California
 BBC Student Life, a school support site on the BBC website

See also
 On the Poverty of Student Life, a pamphlet first published by students of the University of Strasbourg and the Situationist International in 1966